Glutaric acidemia type 2 is an autosomal recessive metabolic disorder that is characterised by defects in the ability of the body to use proteins and fats for energy.  Incompletely processed proteins and fats can build up, leading to a dangerous chemical imbalance called acidosis.

Individuals with glutaric acidemia type 2 frequently experience exercise-induced muscle fatigue, hypotonia, myalgia, and proximal muscle weakness.

Genetics

Mutations in the ETFA, ETFB, and ETFDH genes cause glutaric acidemia type II. Mutations in these genes result in a deficiency in one of two enzymes that normally work together in the mitochondria, which are the energy-producing centers of cells. The ETFA and ETFB genes encode two subunits of the enzyme electron transfer flavoprotein, while the ETFDH gene encodes the enzyme electron-transferring-flavoprotein dehydrogenase. When one of these enzymes is defective or missing, the mitochondria cannot function normally, partially broken-down proteins and fats accumulate in the cells and damage them; this damage leads to the signs and symptoms of glutaric acidemia type II.

This condition is inherited in an autosomal recessive pattern, which means the defective gene is located on an autosome, and two copies of the gene – one from each parent – are needed to inherit the disorder. The parents of an individual with an autosomal recessive disorder are carriers of one copy of the defective gene, but do not show signs and symptoms of the disorder themselves.

Diagnosis
Glutaric acidemia type 2 often appears in infancy as a sudden metabolic crisis, in which acidosis and low blood sugar (hypoglycemia) cause weakness, behavior changes, and vomiting. There may also be enlargement of the liver, heart failure, and a characteristic odor resembling that of sweaty feet. Some infants with glutaric acidemia type 2 have birth defects, including multiple fluid-filled growths in the kidneys (polycystic kidneys). Glutaric acidemia type 2 is a very rare disorder. Its precise incidence is unknown. It has been reported in several different ethnic groups.

Treatment
It is important for patients with MADD to strictly avoid fasting to prevent hypoglycemia and crises of metabolic acidosis; for this reason, infants and small children should eat frequent meals. Patients with MADD can experience life-threatening metabolic crises precipitated by common childhood illnesses or other stresses on the body, so avoidance of such stresses is critical. Patients may be advised to follow a diet low in fat and protein and high in carbohydrates, particularly in severe cases. Depending on the subtype, riboflavin (100-400 mg/day), coenzyme Q10 (CoQ10), L-carnitine, or glycine supplements may be used to help restore energy production. Some small, uncontrolled studies have reported that racemic salts of beta-hydroxybutyrate were helpful in patients with moderately severe disease; further research is needed.

See also
 Glutaric acidemia type 1
 Riboflavin-responsive exercise intolerance - similar in biochemical features, also responsive to riboflavin

References

This article incorporates public domain text from The U.S. National Library of Medicine

External links

Amino acid metabolism disorders
Autosomal recessive disorders